Jens Einarsson (born 27 December 1954) is an Icelandic former handball player who competed in the 1984 Summer Olympics.

References

1954 births
Living people
Jens Einarsson
Jens Einarsson
Handball players at the 1984 Summer Olympics